The British Independent Film Award for Best Screenplay is an annual award given by the British Independent Film Awards (BIFA) to recognize the best screenplay in a British independent film. The award was first presented in the 1998 ceremony with Paul Laverty being the first recipient of this award for his work in Ken Loach's My Name is Joe.

Steven Knight, Armando Iannucci and Simon Blackwell are the only nominees who have received this award more than once with two wins each while Paul Laverty has received the most nominations for this category with six followed by Lynne Ramsay with four.

Winners and nominees

1990s

2000s

2010s

2020s

Multiple nominations

6 nominations
 Paul Laverty
4 nominations
 Lynne Ramsay
3 nominations
 Hanif Kureishi
 Steven Knight
 Peter Morgan
 Frank Cottrell Boyce
 Armando Iannucci
 Shane Meadows

2 nominations
 Martin McDonagh
 Abi Morgan
 Tim Firth
 Steve McQueen
 Matt Greenhalgh
 Simon Blackwell
 Jesse Armstrong
 Nick Hornby
 Peter Strickland
 Alex Garland
 John Michael McDonagh
 Amy Jump
 Andrea Arnold
 Peter Mullan
 Paul Fraser

Multiple wins

2 wins
 Steven Knight
 Armando Iannucci
 Simon Blackwell

References

External links
 Official website

British Independent Film Awards